Ciutadella  Vila Olímpica is the name of a station in the Barcelona Metro network, as well of a nearby Trambesòs station in the Sant Martí district of Barcelona. It's named after one of Barcelona's major parks, Parc de la Ciutadella, and Vila Olímpica, a neighbourhood in the immediate vicinities. It's served by L4 (yellow line), and tram route T4, of which it is a terminus. It was built in  under Parc de Carles I. It was closed between 1991 and 1992 because of infrastructure improvement with the occasion of the 1992 Olympic Games, and again as of mid-2007 due to improvement of L4.

Within two blocks stands the Ciutadella campus of Pompeu Fabra University and the station is often crowded with university students. In summer it's also common to spot tourists heading to the Barceloneta beach. The nearest metro stations are Barceloneta and Bogatell.

Before 1982 it was known as Ribera (named after the neighbourhood), and from then to 1992, simply as Ciutadella.

Services

See also
Parc de la Ciutadella
Vila Olímpica

External links

Ciutadella-Vila Olímpica at Trenscat.com
Ciutadella-Vila Olímpica Trambesòs station at Trenscat.com

Railway stations in Spain opened in 1977
Barcelona Metro line 4 stations
Trambesòs stops
Transport in Ciutat Vella